The Governor General's Award for French-language children's writing is a Canadian literary award that annually recognizes one Canadian writer for a children's book written in French. It is one of four children's book awards among the Governor General's Awards for Literary Merit, one each for writers and illustrators of English- and French-language books. The Governor General's Awards program is administered by the Canada Council.

In name, this award is part of the Governor General's Award program only from 1987 but the four children's literature awards were established in 1975 under a Canada Council name. In the event, the "Canada Council" and "Governor General's" awards have recognized writing in a French-language children's book every year from 1975.

Canada Council Children's Literature Prize 

In 1975 the Canada Council established four annual prizes of $5000 for the year's best English- and French-language children's books by Canadian writers and illustrators. Those "Canada Council Children's Literature Prizes" were continued under the "Governor General's Awards" rubric from 1987, and continue today. Among them the French-language writing prize was awarded every year from 1975.

 1975: Louise Aylwin, Raminagradu: Histoires ordinaires pour enfants extraordinaire
 1976: Bernadette Renaud, Emilie, la baignoire à pattes
 1977: Denise Houle, Lune de neige
 1978: Ginette Anfousse, La chicane
 1979: Gabrielle Roy, Courte-Queue, ill. François Olivier;
 English translation, Cliptail (McClelland & Stewart, 1980)
 1980: , Hébert Luée
 1981: Suzanne Martel, Nos amis robots;
 English translation, Robot Alert (Kids Can Press, 1982)
 1982: Ginette Anfousse, Fabien 1: Un loup pour Rose and Fabien 2: Une nuit au pays des malices
 1983: , Hockeyeurs Cybernétiques
 1984: Daniel Sernine, Le cercle violet
 1985: , Casse-tête chinois
 1986: , Le derneir des raisins

1980s

1990s

2000s

2010s

2020s

See also 

 Governor General's Award for French-language children's illustration
 Governor General's Award for English-language children's literature
 Governor General's Award for English-language children's illustration

References

Canadian children's literary awards
French
Awards established in 1987
1987 establishments in Canada
Children
French-language literary awards